Jacob Bailey (16 April 1731 – 26 July 1808) was an author and clergyman of the Church of England, active in New England and Nova Scotia.

Biography
Bailey was born in Rowley, Massachusetts, and was educated at Harvard College, ranked at the bottom (by social order) of the class of 1755, which notably also included John Adams.  He started his career in the ministry as a Congregational preacher in New Hampshire but converted and became an Anglican clergyman in 1760, through his connection with Dr. Silvester Gardiner, a prominent Massachusetts physician, businessman, and landowner.  Gardiner, also Anglican, sought a minister to serve the rural parish of Frankfort or Pownalborough (now Dresden, Maine, but then part of Massachusetts), which was part of the lands his business partnership, the Kennebec Proprietors, oversaw.  Bailey's congregation was a mix of mainly German Lutheran and French Huguenot immigrants, who were often at odds on matters of religion with the area's Yankee Congregationalists.

Despite continuing friction with the local Congregationalists, Bailey was able to build a church and parsonage in 1770-71.  Hostilities towards Bailey continued, especially when he continued to profess Loyalty to the British Crown, and he moved with his family to Nova Scotia in 1779, after American Patriots twice made attempts on his life. He served in the parish of Cornwallis for a period and then moved to Annapolis Royal where he remained for the rest of his life.

In 1780, Rev. Bailey was appointed the Deputy Chaplain to the 84th Regiment.

Poet 
It is through his writings that Bailey's place in Canadian history was assured. His poetry was widely known and his verse satire was considered to be styled like that of the English poet, Samuel Butler.

He wrote a considerable amount of prose as well and much of this can contribute to historians' studies of those times.

"Behold the vaunting hero," Royal Gazette and the Nova-Scotia Advertiser (Halifax), 11 Dec. 1798, and "Observations and conjectures on the antiquities of America," Mass. Hist. Soc., Coll. (Boston), 1st ser., 4 (1795): 100–5. Three of Bailey's poems are printed and discussed in Narrative verse satire in Maritime Canada, 1779–1814, ed. T. B. Vincent (Ottawa, 1978).

Bailey is buried in the Garrison Cemetery (Annapolis Royal, Nova Scotia).

See also 
Nova Scotia in the American Revolution

References

Further reading 
JAMES S. LEAMON. "The Reverend Jacob Bailey, Maine Loyalist": "For God, King, Country, and for Self" - A lively biography of a loyalist caught in the upheaval of the American Revolution. University of Mass.  Press. 2012.
 The Frontier Missionary: A Memoir of Rev. Jacob Bailey. 1853
   Rev. Jacob Bailey: His Character and Works By Charles Edwin Allen
Kent Thompson. The Man Who Said No: Reading Jacob Bailey, Loyalist. Gaspereau Press. 2008.
 Ray Palmer Baker, "The Poetry of Jacob Bailey, Loyalist," NEQ, 2:58–92 (Jan. 1929)
Taunya J. Dawson. "Keeping the Loyalists Loyal in Post-Revolutionary Nova Scotia: The Preaching and Writing of Reverend Jacob Bailey," Historical Papers: Canadian Society of Church History (May 2014):17-28. https://historicalpapers.journals.yorku.ca/index.php/historicalpapers/issue/view/2268.

External links
 Biography at the Dictionary of Canadian Biography Online

1731 births
1808 deaths
Canadian Anglican priests
Converts to Anglicanism from Congregationalism
Anglican poets
18th-century Canadian poets
Canadian male poets
Harvard College Loyalists in the American Revolution
American Loyalists from Massachusetts
Loyalists who settled Nova Scotia
People from Rowley, Massachusetts
Religious leaders from Massachusetts
People from Dresden, Maine
Harvard College alumni
18th-century Canadian male writers